Dalton Sharman "Rusty" Jackson (November 17, 1950 – April 14, 1997) was a professional American football player who played punter for four seasons for the Los Angeles Rams and Buffalo Bills.
Jackson played high school football at Washington County High School in Chatom, Alabama.

References

1950 births
Sportspeople from Tuscaloosa, Alabama
Players of American football from Alabama
People from Washington County, Alabama
American football punters
Los Angeles Rams players
Buffalo Bills players
LSU Tigers football players
1997 deaths